Premium economy class, also known as elite economy class or economy plus class, is a travel class offered on some airlines. It is usually positioned between standard economy class and business class in terms of price, comfort, and available amenities. In 1991, EVA Air was the first to introduce Evergreen Class (later renamed Elite Class, and then to Premium Economy Class), becoming the first airline to offer this class of service. It was widely acknowledged that the premium economy class has become a standard reflection of what the economy class was like several decades ago. In some countries, this class has emerged as a response from governments and companies requiring economy class for travel done by staff.

Characteristics
As of 2018, the term has not been standardised among airlines, and varies significantly between domestic and international flights, as well as between low-cost or regional airlines and other airlines. Premium economy is sometimes limited to expanded leg room, but its most comprehensive versions can feature services associated with business class travel.

At the other extreme, some airlines market extra legroom seats in economy class, with the same service and seat model, as an enhanced economy class. For example, in the United States domestic market, airlines such as American, United, Delta, and JetBlue have an upgraded economy class with  more leg room as the only difference; they market the class as Main Cabin Extra, Economy Plus, Comfort+, and Even More Space respectively, while other services such as ground services and food and beverage services are on par with their normal economy class.

Service codes used by airlines vary, but W is the most common code.

Examples of differences
Differences between premium economy class and standard economy class may include (varies by airline and country):

 a free upgrade to premium members of frequent-flyer program and passengers flying full-fare economy,
 a separate section of the economy/coach cabin with more legroom ( seat pitch), along with some form of leg rest,
 improved in-flight entertainment features (larger screen, more options, included headphones, etc.)
 dedicated cabin crew
 smaller cabin size
 better seats (often fewer seats per row, allowing seats to be wider, and to increase shoulder/elbow room, further ahead which gives less engine noise and faster deplaning)
 at-seat laptop power
 at-seat telephone
 lounge access (for some airlines)
 priority check in/security check/boarding
 increased frequent flyer points
 exclusive amenity kits
 hot towel service
 welcome drinks (juice or champagne)
 upgraded meals and drinks
 increased luggage allowance
 better re-booking possibility

Some airlines may designate an entire economy class as premium, such as United Airlines on its transcontinental Boeing 757-200 premium service aircraft, or Singapore Airlines' Airbus A350-900 Ultra Long Range (ULR) aircraft. In other airlines premium economy may be what used to be regular economy before more seats were added, or just the most attractive rows in the economy section. Premium economy tickets also normally earn more mileage in an airline's frequent flyer program, attracting a bonus between economy and business. These upgrades tend to be more common on wide-body aircraft, such as the Boeing 747 and Boeing 777, and less common on narrow-body aircraft, such as the Boeing 737.

Configuration
Seven-abreast Configuration (2-3-2 Configuration):Airbus A330, Airbus A340, Airbus A350 XWB(applicable for Lufthansa and China Airlines use only), Airbus A380(Upper Deck), Boeing 787 Dreamliner.
Eight-abreast Configuration (2-4-2 Configuration):Boeing 747, Boeing 777, Boeing 777X,  Airbus A350 XWB(applicable for most of the Airline in the world), Airbus A380(Main Deck).

Airlines

Airlines offering this service include:

 Aerolíneas Argentinas: Club Economy: Only on Boeing 737s and Embraer E190s. Replacing business class on all domestic flights and international flights under four hours. Offers similar benefits to business class, including lounge access.
 Aeroflot: Comfort class
 Aeroméxico: Aeroméxico Plus, now standard across the entire Boeing fleet. Offers  extra legroom,  more recline and adjustable leather headrests. Includes priority check-in, baggage handling, boarding and deplaning, as well as extra mileage for frequent flyers.
 Air Austral: Classe Comfort
 Air Senegal: Premium Economy is offered on their Airbus A330-900, in a 2-3-2 configuration in contrast to 2-4-2 (Economy) and 1-2-1 (Business)
 Air Canada: Premium Economy - on some international routes with new Boeing 777, Airbus A330-300 and on all Boeing 787 aircraft.
 Air Caraïbes: La Classe Caraïbes (long haul only. Offers  of pitch, more recline, a wider seat, a larger personal television (PTV) and more)
 Air China: Premium Economy Class (only on Airbus A330-300s and Boeing 777-200s. Wider seat with at least  of pitch, nearly double recline and a PTV, plus more amenities. The new Boeing 747-8s and 787-9s will also offer Premium Economy)
 Air France: Premium Economy. Offers SkyPriority, paid lounge access, improved meals (including stainless steel cutlery and real glass drink ware), a separate cabin featuring fixed shell seats with a  pitch and extra wide armrests.
 Air Transat: Club Class
 Air New Zealand: Premium Economy (all routes operated by wide-body aircraft, offers  pitch and more recline. Includes premium meals and check-in, two checked bags and two carry bags.)
 AirAsia: Hot seat
 AirAsia X: Hot seat
 Alaska Airlines: Premium Class: Offers  more pitch, priority boarding, premium snack, and premium beverage.
 All Nippon Airways: Premium Economy class offers wider seats, more legroom and a footrest. Perks includes dedicated check-in counter, priority baggage handling, and lounge access.
 Allegiant Air: Legroom Plus: Offers up to  more pitch. Giant Seats: Only on Boeing 757s. Bigger seats with at least  more pitch, similar to Spirit's Big Front Seats.
 American Airlines: Main Cabin Extra (offers a slightly wider seat only on the Boeing 777-300ER,  more recline and  more legroom but no other benefits). Premium Economy available on the entire long-haul fleet. Premium Economy customers will also get two free checked bags, priority boarding, and enhanced food and drink service including free alcohol. This product will make American Airlines the first United States carrier to offer a four-cabin aircraft.
 Asiana Airlines: Economy Smartium on all Airbus A350-900.
 Austrian Airlines: Premium Economy 
 Avianca: Economy Plus (only international service Airbus A330-200 between El Dorado-Bogotá - Adolfo Suárez Madrid–Barajas - Bogotá, Bogotá - Josep Tarradellas Barcelona–El Prat - Bogotá, Alfonso Bonilla Aragón-Cali - Madrid - Cali, José María Córdova-Medellin - Madrid - Medellin)
 Biman Bangladesh Airlines: Premium Economy -available on Boeing 787-9 Dreamliner.
 British Airways: World Traveller Plus is BA's premium economy class and it offers more spacious seats in a separate cabin, free alcoholic beverages and better food options.
 Brussels Airlines: Economy Privilege
 Cathay Pacific: Premium Economy on Airbus A350 fleet and selected Boeing 777-300ER aircraft.
 China Airlines: Premium Economy Class- now available on Boeing 777-300ER and Airbus A350-900.
 Condor: Premium Economy offers more recline and  more legroom on long haul flights in its Boeing 767-300 fleet, free spirits during meals, free amenity kits, free headsets and more. Short haul planes have the middle seat blocked off and no extra legroom or recline.
Transcontinental flights between John F. Kennedy International and Los Angeles International / Seattle–Tacoma International / San Francisco International also get one free premium snack and a free cold meal from Luvo Inc., as well as a pre-departure bottle of water and a sleep kit) 
 Edelweiss Air: Economy Max: Long-haul only.
 El Al: Premium Class / Premium Economy on Boeing 747s, 777s, 787s and 767s. Offers  more pitch ( up from the usual ), 33 percent more recline, a footrest, priority ground service, a comfort kit, a bottle holder and more.
 Emirates: Premium economy class is available only on Airbus A380 with service between Dubai International, Charles de Gaulle-Paris, Heathrow-London, Sydney, John F. Kennedy-New York (from 1 December 2022), Auckland (from January 2023), Melbourne (from February 2023), San Francisco (from February 2023), Changi-Singapore (from March 2023) and Christchurch (from March 2023).
 EVA Air: Premium Economy Class (only on all Boeing 777-300ER aircraft)
 Finnair: Premium Economy class is available on select flights to Asia and North America on Airbus A350 and A330 aircraft. Offers  pitch, comfier headrests, an amenity kit, better headphones and upgraded dining.
 Frontier Airlines: Stretch (first four rows and exit rows of Airbus offering a minimum of  pitch.)
 Hawaiian Airlines: Extra Comfort (Airbus A330-200 and A321neo aircraft, comes with priority boarding, full ) of legroom, complimentary on-demand in-seat entertainment, upgraded meal on international main meal only, comfort kit on international routes only, complimentary pillow and blanket on all domestic routes, souvenir pillow and blanket set on international routes only).
 Iberia: Premium Economy on Airbus A340 and A330: Larger seat width / pitch, larger IFE screen, amenity kit, and priority check in/boarding.
 Icelandair: Economy comfort
 Japan Airlines: Premium Economy class offers a more spacious seat with footrest, upgraded dining and beverage options, and an amenity kit.
 KLM: Economy Comfort is available on all KLM and KLM Cityhopper flights. Except for the increased pitch and recline, seating and service in Economy Comfort is the same as in Economy Class. Economy Comfort is located in a separate cabin before the Economy Class; passengers can exit the aircraft before Economy passengers.
 LATAM Brasil: Space Plus: Only on select Boeing 777s. Offers at least  of seat pitch and more recline.
 LATAM Chile: Premium Economy: Only on Airbus A320 series planes. Provides more legroom, width, and recline, plus the middle seat is blocked out to allow more space.
 LOT Polish Airlines: Premium Club (long-haul only)
 Lufthansa: Premium Economy is available in all long-haul flights and features more spacious seats and upgraded dining.
 Mahan Air: Bigger seats and more legroom on Airbus A340s long haul flights
 Oman Air: All economy cabins are premium class with  seat pitch
 Pakistan International Airlines: Executive Economy. Seats with more legroom and vacant middle seat are offered in Executive Economy on board the Airbus A320 aircraft.
 Philippine Airlines: Premium Economy (only on Airbus A321s, newer Airbus A330s and A350s. On PAL Express flights using two class Airbus A320s, the business class seats are sold as Premium Economy)
 Qantas: Premium Economy is available on Boeing 787s and Airbus A380s aircraft on selected routes.
 Scandinavian Airlines: SAS Plus (previously named Economy Extra, the features remain the same). Wider seats in 2-3-2 configurations and upgraded dining are available on their Asia and North America routes.
 Scoot: Super / Stretch seats (located in the first few rows and all bulkhead and exit rows in the economy cabin. Seats offer more width,  more pitch and on Boeing 787s, adjustable headrests. These seats are distinguished be being a different colour that the standard economy seats in light blue and Super / Stretch seats in dark blue.)
 Singapore Airlines: Premium Economy class aboard all Airbus A350-900, Airbus A380-800, and refitted Boeing 777-300ER aircraft, with service to Europe and the United States.
 SpiceJet: Premium economy (located in the first five rows and exit rows of all Boeing 737s, featuring a  seat pitch, priority boarding and baggage handling and a larger baggage allowance, much like the SpiceMAX bundle)
 Sunwing Airlines: Elite Plus: Offers at least  extra pitch, larger baggage allowance, and priority boarding, check-in and baggage handling.
 Thai Airways International: Premium Economy (only on Boeing 777-300ER routes to Copenhagen and Stockholm Arlanda). It uses same seat as Royal Silk Class (Business Class).
 Ukraine International Airlines: Premium Economy (only on Boeing 767s. Offers  of pitch and a wider seat, plus priority ground service, better food options including a free glass of wine, and increased baggage allowance)
 United Airlines: United Premium Plus offers wider seats with more recline, extra legroom, alcoholic drinks, and upgraded dining. Economy Plus is offered on all flights.
 Vietnam Airlines: Premium Economy class is available on Airbus A350s and Boeing 787-900 aircraft on selected routes.
 Virgin Atlantic: Premium Economy class offers roomier seats, dedicated check-in counter, priority boarding, upgraded dining, among other perks. Available on international flights on A330, A350, and B-787-9 aircraft.
 Virgin Australia: Economy X. Economy X offers a more premium experience at the airport and onboard, within the affordability of economy class. Economy X includes extra legroom, Preferred overhead locker space (Virgin Australia operated flights only), Priority boarding and priority screening (where available).
 Vistara: Premium Economy (in Airbus A320-200) seats have  longer pitch and recline further than in economy class, cold / hot towel service, welcome drinks, specially curated menu with two vegetarian and one non-vegetarian meal option, dedicated check in counters, priority boarding, extra baggage allowance and priority baggage handling, extra Club Vistara points. Vistara will also have Premium Economy class on its upcoming Airbus A321neos and Boeing 787-9s which are expected to join the Vistara fleet by 2020.
 WestJet: Premium Class: On WestJet's 787, Premium Class is in a separate, dedicated cabin. Larger seats with greater recline are offered in a 2-3-2 configuration. Complimentary hot meals, alcoholic and non-alcoholic beverages are included. A self-serve social area is also available. On international flights, an amenity kit is provided. On WestJet's 737, Premium Class is separated from economy with sky dividers and curtain. Larger seats with greater recline are offered in a 2-2 configuration. Complimentary plated hot meals, alcoholic and non-alcoholic beverages are included.

Some airlines no longer offer premium economy:
Olympic Air: If passengers were travelling aboard a Bombardier Dash-8, the seat next to them could remain empty upon their request. This service was branded as "Premium Economy Class" and cost more than normal economy class. Moreover, they could use premium check-in facilities, if available, and were offered a welcome drink on board. Aircraft other than the Dash 8 didn't offer Premium Economy, but Business Class, which was discontinued immediately after the airline's buyout. Premium Economy was discontinued after the airline buyout too, because of its similarities to the business class of the company who bought them, Aegean Airlines.
However, these seats were very exclusive, because they were mainly reserved for Voyager Platinum and Star Alliance Gold passengers. The Boeing 747-400s were retired from SAA's fleet in 2010, and the Premium Economy product was retired as well.

See also 
 First class (aviation)
 Hypermobility (travel)
 Deep vein thrombosis or traveller’s thrombosis, sometimes nicknamed "Economy class syndrome"

References

External links

Premium Economy vs. Economy 2019 – What’s the difference?

Airline tickets
Passenger rail transport
Travel classes